PNMA-like protein 1, or paraneoplastic Ma antigen family member 8A is a protein that in humans is encoded by the PNMAL1 gene.

References

Further reading